Thomas Tycho AM MBE DMus (11 April 19284 April 2013) was  Hungarian-born Australian pianist, conductor, composer and arranger. He was active in both classical music and pop. 

He was associated with musical productions on Australian television for many years from its inception in 1956, including such programs as The Mavis Bramston Show. The recorded version of the National Anthem Advance Australia Fair that is now usually used to accompany singers at major sporting and community events is Tommy Tycho's arrangement. He wrote a number of film scores, and his activities bridged both popular and classical styles.

Biography

Tycho was born in Budapest in April 1928.  His father was a senior government official and his mother was an opera singer who had retired to raise a family. His musical life started as a child prodigy pianist.  He played George Gershwin's Rhapsody in Blue with the Budapest Philharmonic Orchestra at age 10. He had been introduced to the work by his teacher, Egon Petri. He commenced studying at the Franz Liszt Academy of Music in Budapest, where his teachers included Leo Weiner and Zoltán Kodály. He and his parents had adopted Lutheranism in an attempt to disguise their Jewishness, but to no avail – he was interned in a German forced labour camp in 1943 at age 15, and was lucky to survive. He resumed his studies after the war, but fled his country ahead of the Communist takeover while still only in his third year of study.  From 1948 to 1951 he lived in Iran, where he was the personal pianist for the Shah of Iran. There he met a Hungarian soprano named Eva Komer, who became his wife. They emigrated to Australia in 1951.

He was Musical Director at the Seven Network for 15 years, 1956–1971, was involved in nine Royal Command Performances, and has conducted all the ABC symphony orchestras. His work was an important element of many official openings (Sydney Opera House, Sydney Entertainment Centre, Sydney Football Stadium, Queensland Performing Arts Centre, Brisbane 1982 Commonwealth Games, World Expo 88, Darling Harbour, major sporting grand finals, etc.). In 2008 he performed at the piano for Crown Princess Mary of Denmark at the opening of the Victor Chang Cardiac Research Institute. (In 1980, after a heart attack, he had been treated personally by Dr Victor Chang.)

The Australian artists with whom he worked include Peter Allen, Ricky May, Olivia Newton-John, Julie Anthony, John Farnham, Anthony Warlow, Jill Perryman, Barry Crocker, Kamahl, James Morrison, David Campbell, Judi Connelli, violinist Ian Cooper, Suzanne Johnstone, Jackie Love, James Blundell, Don Burrows, Andy Firth, Marina Prior, Rob Guest, Jimmy Little, Tommy Emmanuel, Normie Rowe, Rhonda Burchmore, Ingrid James, Donald Cant and many others. He also worked with overseas performers such as Sammy Davis Jr., Nat King Cole, Shirley Bassey, Louis Armstrong, Jerry Lewis, Frank Sinatra and many others.

Tommy Tycho suffered a serious stroke in 2008. He then lived in a nursing home where he received regular therapy; though his left side was paralysed, he would compose and play with his right hand.

He died on 4 April 2013, aged 84, just one week before his 85th birthday, as a result of complications associated with pneumonia.

Compositions
His compositions and arrangements include:
 3 overtures
 3 concertos (for trumpet, violin, piano)
 The Violin Concerto was written around 2000, but did not have its premiere until 10 April 2010; Maria Lindsay, soloist, played with the Lurline Chamber Orchestra at the Randwick Town Hall.
 television music (documentary series ANZAC, drama series Riptide, and others)
 film scores (Young Einstein, Reckless Kelly, many others)
 arranged over 1,500 pieces for film and television, including:
 "Cole Porter Concerto", based on three Cole Porter tunes
 "Fantasia" (based on three Irving Berlin tunes)
 "No Other Love" (symphonic arrangement of the song by Richard Rodgers
 Symphonic arrangement of "Macarthur Park" by Jimmy Webb
 Symphonic arrangement of Cole Porter's "Begin the Beguine"
 "Tiger Rag" (in the style of Art Tatum)
 the medal ceremony music for the Sydney 2000 Olympic Games and the Melbourne 2006 Commonwealth Games
 songs for stage revues including Lie Back and Enjoy It and There Will Be an Interval of 15 Minutes and a musical When We Are Married for the Phillip Theatre, and arrangements for a musical Get Happy (2003)

In 2003 Tommy Tycho was commissioned by Symphony Australia to compose and arrange an overture for the 75th birthday celebrations of the West Australian Symphony Orchestra.  That same year he conducted the Queensland Orchestra for concerts with Anthony Warlow, and was the arranger and conductor for Warlow's album, Let's Face the Music; and he conducted the Adelaide Symphony Orchestra in a Lounge concert.

Tycho wrote a series of special feature arrangements for Australian clarinetist Andy Firth when he featured as guest artist with the Atlanta Symphony Orchestra in 2006.

Discography

Charting albums

Honours and awards
Among his many accolades can be counted:
 In 1977, Tycho was made a Member of the Order of the British Empire (MBE)
 In 1987 he was appointed a Member of the Order of Australia (AM)
 In 1992 he won the Rotary International Paul Harris Fellowship Award, in appreciation of tangible and significant assistance given for furtherance of better understanding and friendly relations among peoples of the world
 In 2007 he was conferred the degree of Honorary Doctorate of Music from the University of Sydney.

Mo Awards
The Australian Entertainment Mo Awards (commonly known informally as the Mo Awards), were annual Australian entertainment industry awards. They recognise achievements in live entertainment in Australia from 1975 to 2016. Tommy Tycho won one awards in that time.
 (wins only)
|-
| 1984
| Tommy Tycho
| John Campbell Fellowship Award
| 
|-

References

External links
Tommy Tycho

Bibliography

Tycho, Tommy. Music Maestro, Please: the Tommy Tycho story. Brolga, 1995. ISBN 0-9780909608316

Jewish Australian musicians
Hungarian pianists
Hungarian conductors (music)
Hungarian male musicians
Male conductors (music)
Hungarian musical theatre composers
Hungarian film score composers
Male film score composers
Australian pianists
Australian conductors (music)
Australian film score composers
Australian music arrangers
Members of the Order of Australia
Australian Members of the Order of the British Empire
Hungarian Jewish musicians
Musicians from Budapest
1928 births
2013 deaths
Deaths from pneumonia in New South Wales
20th-century pianists
20th-century Australian musicians
Male pianists
20th-century conductors (music)
20th-century Australian male musicians
Daly-Wilson Big Band members